Events from the year 1776 in Canada.

Incumbents
Monarch: George III

Governors
Governor of the Province of Quebec: Guy Carleton
Governor of Nova Scotia: Lord William Campbell
Commodore-Governor of Newfoundland: John Byron
Governor of St. John's Island: Walter Patterson

Events

 American Revolutionary War. United Empire Loyalists move to Upper Canada and settle (lumbering, farming starts).
 April 29 – Benjamin Franklin, Samuel Chase and Rev. John Carroll, a Jesuit, urge Canadians to send delegates to Congress, promising toleration. Franklin brings a printer and press, for a newspaper, to mould public opinion. Canadians regard Franklin as an enemy, and the priests remind Father Carroll that, unlike some of the Provinces, Britain tolerates the Romish Church.
 May 6 – As a British fleet is in sight, the Continental Army, before Quebec, weakened by disease, retires from a superior enemy, who await reinforcements, behind strong walls.
 June 8 – Attempting to surprise Three Rivers, General Thompson, with 200 of 1,800 Americans, is taken prisoner.
 June 16 – Arnold's force has retreated from Montreal.
 June 18 – General Burgoyne finds that the Continental Army has evacuated St. Johns.
 The eleventh Article of "Confederation and Perpetual Union" provides that: "Canada, according to this Confederation, and joining in the measures of the United States, shall be admitted into, and entitled to, all the advantages of this Union; but no other Colony shall be admitted to the same, unless such admission be agreed to by nine States."
 October 11 – The British are victorious on Lake Champlain.
 October 13 – On Lake Champlain, Arnold runs part of his fleet ashore, to avoid capture.
 The Jesuits' College, at Quebec, converted into barracks.
 The American colonies declare their independence. The United States Declaration of Independence is signed July 4, 1776.
 Common Sense by Thomas Paine (1737–1809) appears.
 Under Guy Carleton, Quebec withstands an American siege until the appearance of a British fleet (May 6). Carleton is later knighted.

Births
January 23 – Howard Douglas, soldier, educator, author, inventor, and colonial administrator (d.1861) 
February 21 – Joseph Barss, privateer (d.1824) 
April 3 – François Blanchet, author, physician, teacher, militia officer, businessman, seigneur, politician, office holder (d.1830) 
May 20 – Simon Fraser, fur-trader and explorer (d.1862) 
July 17 – John Neilson, publisher, printer, bookseller, politician, farmer, and militia officer (d.1848)  
August 1 – Archibald Acheson, 2nd Earl of Gosford, colonial administrator (d.1849)  
August 5 – John Willson, judge and political figure (d.1860)

Full date unknown
Colin Campbell, army officer and colonial administrator (d.1847)

Deaths
March 30 – Jonathan Belcher, lawyer, chief justice, and lieutenant governor of Nova Scotia (b.1710)

Historical documents

American Revolutionary War
Maj. Gen. Schuyler tells Washington that attempt to take Quebec City has failed, Brig. Gen. Montgomery is dead and reinforcements required in Canada

Maryland delegate to Congress recommends Catholic fellow delegate and himself to go to Canada to rally support and raise troops for rebel cause

Commander in occupied Montreal on "many Enemies in this province" (especially clergy), locals commissioned to his forces, and need of heavy arms

Washington emphasizes to Arnold importance of victory in Canada to "crown our virtuous struggles" and "Render the freedom of [our] Country secure"

"Jean Baptist or Ogaghsagighte" and others chiefs, sent by Kahnawake and other First Nations, tell Washington they can send fighters to Schuyler

Montrealer Preudhome La Jeunesse wants Congress to send agents to explain to clergy and gentry their goals in war and their friendship toward Canada

Arnold says his army struggles with smallpox, poor clothing and worse pay, attractions of deserting, and "Trouble of Reconceleing [with] Inhabitants"

Benjamin Franklin, Chase and Carroll sent to form executive commission in Canada and urge Canadians to unite with and adopt American democracy

Logistical, strategic and political challenges "for our little Army and for the Poor Canadians who have taken part with the United Colonies"

John Adams admits "we have been a little tardy in providing for Canada[;] however We have been roused at last, and I hope have done pretty well"

Commissioners in Montreal find Continental money worthless, their people no longer trusted and Congress thought bankrupt and its cause desperate

With newly arrived reinforcements, Gov. Carleton routs rebel force that has besieged Quebec City for five months and seizes their blockade ships

British plans were to include sending Burgoyne with 10,000 troops (Hessians, Hanoverians and British) to Canada to join up with Gage on Hudson River

John Adams says simply, "Our affairs in Canada are in a confused and disastrous situation. But I hope they will not be worse."

Brig. Gen. Sullivan reports "men Women & Children Leaping & Clapping their hands" as he arrives at Sorel to meet British thrust up St. Lawrence River

Maj. Gen. Schuyler receives word that army's attack on British at Trois-Rivières has been defeated, and it must retreat to St.-Jean for return home

Believing "there has been very gross Misconduct in the Management of our Affairs in Canada," Congress orders general inquiry into officers involved

Sullivan reports from upper Richelieu River that his retreat to Lake Champlain is threatened by smallpox pandemic in his troops (Note: "savages" used)

"How happy for us" - Montreal residents congratulate Gov. Carleton and "the brave and loyal Citizens of Quebec" for victory over rebels

"Extraordinary efforts of resolution" - With larger naval force, Carleton defeats Brig. Gen. Arnold to regain control of Lake Champlain

Congress sends home Canadians captured unarmed, but makes Luc de la Corne and another agree not to take up arms against U.S. or aid its enemies

Map spanning regions from Lac St.-Pierre to Cape May, including Montreal, Lake Champlain and eastern Six Nations territories

"A Declaration would have influenced our Affairs in Canada" - John Adams says his pro-reconciliation and anti-independence colleagues lost Canada

Canada

Governor, lieutenant governor, chief justice and Council (or any five of them) make up Quebec's new court of appeal

In dispute with governor, Peter Livius accuses Carleton of bypassing Council (by August 8, 1776 order), with five favourites making major decisions

Praise for Carleton's humanity "towards our deluded Countrymen who have been either bullyed or betrayed into the present unnatural Rebellion"

With end of U.S. occupation, Gazette printer William Brown happily renews ties with subscribers to "The Most Innocent Gazette in the British Dominions"

Grain in storage and big current crop allow reopening of general wheat exportation, but restrictions remain on shipping flour, biscuits and livestock

"A Citizen of Quebec" requests effective market regulation and prevention of "Huxtering, Engrossing, Forestalling, &c.[...]at a great Height in this City"

Carleton finds nothing to fear from Canadians during prosperity and nothing to hope from them (besides honourable few) during times of distress

Instruction offered "Young Gentlemen[...]in various Literature," including "Locke on the human Understanding,[...]Milton, Shakespeare, Pope, Gay, &c."

Peter Fitzgerald disclaims marriage to (and debts of) "a Woman lately arrived from Halifax, in Nova-Scotia, who calls herself Mary FitzGerald"

Nova Scotia

"I hate the Climate where Rebellion + Fanaticism are ingendred" - Loyalist disowns revolutionary Massachusetts in letter to Edward Winslow

Cumberland County, Nova Scotia resident tells Washington that many there support Colonies and all Acadians do, but troops must be sent to help them

"The rebels[...]obliged Gen. Howe to quit Boston" - British troops and loyalists leave Boston for Halifax

Lt. Gov. Arbuthnot, noting inflation despite departure of fleet and army, declares anyone charging more than set prices for food to be "Extortioners"

Report from Halifax that "a considerable body of rebels" are besieging Fort Cumberland and "people in Halifax are in great consternation"

Arguing how low-cost pre-war governments in North America were, Adam Smith points to Nova Scotia's £7,000 "a year towards the publick expences"

Nova Scotia law allows local court to fine ("amerce") township residents who neglect to vote funds to support local poor people

Haligonian seeks "a Negro Woman named Florimell [who] wears a Handkerchief round her Head, has Scars in her Face[...]and is not very black"

Rev. John Breynton of Halifax sells "Negro Woman Called Dinah about twenty five years of age" to Peter Shey of Falmouth for £23 6/8

Labrador

"I have learned sorcery, and I have practised it, but that is the road to the greatest darkness" - Inuk named Kingminguse is baptised at Nain

George Cartwright's instructions for building foot bridge, one of his many practical projects for living in Labrador

"Mountaineer" (Innu) way of hunting deer with musket allows them to fire shots more quickly, but "they generally over-charge" with too much gunpowder

Getting "burnt" by touching cold metal, Cartwright recalls lines from "Hudibras": "And many dangers shall environ, The man who meddles with cold iron"

Indigenous nations

At their meeting, Six Nations and "seven Tribes" from Canada agree to remain neutral, though some (Senecas, Mohawks) are ready "to act against Us"

Maj. Gen. Schuyler's early June correspondence on "Attack of the upper Indians against our Western Frontiers" in New York (Note: "savages" used)

Massachusetts General Court signs treaty with Mi'kmaq and "St John's Indians" to recruit fighters for "Service of the United States" (Note: see footnotes)

Thomas Jefferson tells fellow Virginian that Congress has so strongly warned Six Nations against attacking that they "keep their people in quiet"

Letter from Albany says Kanien’kéhà:ka sachems objected to Schuyler's expedition against John Johnson, but admitted it was allowed under their treaty

Henry on Prairies: "The country was[...]a continued level, without a single eminence; a frozen sea, of which the little coppices were the islands"

Henry listens to Assiniboine players of drums, gourds etc. with women singing - "the sweetness of their voices exceeded whatever I had heard before"

"When they move, the sounds keep time, and make a fantastic harmony" - Assiniboine and Cree women put small bells and deer hooves on skirt hems

Chipewyans from Lake Athabasca canoe down to Henry's post on upper Churchill River to trade 12,000 beaver skins (plus slaves) over three days

Continental Congress agent at French court to acquire (along with uniforms and weapons) £40,000 worth of "goods for presents to the Indians"

"I can see thee, My Father; can talk with thee and can invoke thy mercy" - "Sioux chief" shares pipe with Carleton (Note: "savages" and "squaw" used)

Etc.

Illustration: "Key for Benjamin West's 'Death of General Wolfe'" has detail of figures in painting, including Brig. Gen. Monckton and surgeon Mr. Adair

References 

 
76
Canada